Poly Prep Country Day School (commonly known as Poly Prep) is an independent, co-educational day school with two campuses in Brooklyn, New York, United States. The Middle School (5th to 8th grades) and Upper School (9th to 12th grades) are located in the Dyker Heights section of Brooklyn, while the Lower School (nursery to 4th grade) is located in Brooklyn's Park Slope neighborhood. Initially founded as part of the Brooklyn Collegiate and Polytechnic Institute (predecessor of the NYU Tandon School of Engineering), Poly Prep now offers classes from nursery school through 12th grade.

History
Poly Prep was established  years ago in 1854 as the Brooklyn Collegiate and Polytechnic Institute in Downtown Brooklyn. It was one of the first private boys' schools in the city of Brooklyn. The initial aim of the school was to offer an academic program similar to that of boarding schools of the time while striving to maintain a strong community feel among students and faculty alike.

After 45 years, the future of the Brooklyn Collegiate and Polytechnic Institute was re-evaluated in 1889, when the preparatory school and the collegiate division were finally separated. In 1891, the construction of a new building next door to the school's original building provided a home for the college, which became known as the Polytechnic Institute of Brooklyn. Both divisions still exist, although the collegiate division, after many changes of name, was eventually acquired by New York University (NYU) in 2008 and, as of 2014, is now known as the New York University Tandon School of Engineering.

After its initial separation from the collegiate division, the Polytechnic Preparatory Institute remained an all-boys collegiate preparatory program at 99 Livingston Street and, by the mid-1890s, had already become one of the largest prep schools in the country, with over 600 students.

Move to Dyker Heights

The school acquired its Dyker Heights location in 1916 after a 25-acre parcel of land, formerly the Dyker Meadow Golf Course, was offered to the trustees. Classes began during the fall of 1917 at the new campus, amid continued construction that helped shape much of the school's current appearance.

Going co-educational
During the tenure of headmaster William M. Williams, the school began the transition to co-education in 1977 when it first admitted girls, graduating its first co-ed class in 1979.

Creating primary school

Poly Prep's most recent and dramatic expansion occurred in 1995, with its acquisition of the historic Hulbert Mansion from the Brooklyn Ethical Culture Society, a site formerly rented by the now defunct Woodward Park School. The new property was converted into Poly's Lower School, offering classes for students from nursery through 4th grade.

Major primary school expansion

In the 2006–2007 school year, a modern expansion was added onto the Park Slope building. As part of its "Blue and Gray Goes Green!" initiative, Poly chose to reduce the new Lower School's ecological "footprint". Poly's renovated Lower School became the first LEED-certified school building in New York City, and the first such primary school building in the state.

In April 2009, Poly Prep's Lower School won the Lucy B. Moses Award from the New York Landmarks Conservancy as an outstanding example of historic preservation and renovation.

Child abuse claims
The school was the subject of a federal lawsuit filed in the United States District Court for the Eastern District of New York in Brooklyn in 2009 centering on the sexual assault of students by Philip Foglietta, the head football coach from 1966 to 1991. A 2004 state suit against the school had been dismissed due to the statute of limitations, but U.S. District Court Judge Frederic Block subsequently ruled that portions of the suit could proceed in federal court because administrators may have lied about when they learned of the abuse. Plaintiffs' attorney Kevin Mulhearn cited the Racketeer Influenced and Corrupt Organizations Act in alleging that past and current administrators had engaged in a coverup of the abuse. Published reports compared the abuse and alleged coverup to a similar scandal at Pennsylvania State University in 2011. In March 2012 the law firm Pillsbury Winthrop Shaw Pittman joined the plaintiffs on a pro bono basis. On September 19, 2012, new allegations connecting Foglietta and Jerry Sandusky surfaced.

The suit was settled for $10 million in December 2012. On February 21, 2014, the school issued what the Wall Street Journal called "a sweeping apology" for the abuse and the school's failure over the decades to respond appropriately when victims revealed their abuse. The headmaster of the school, David Harman, and the chairman of the board of trustees, Scott Smith, subsequently resigned.

Institution

Divisions
Poly Prep consists of three divisions, beginning with the Lower School located at 50 Prospect Park West in Brooklyn. Lower School education commences with the nursery school program, which consists of early childhood learning up until the pre-kindergarten level, and continues on through fourth grade. The middle school program begins at grade 5, at which point Poly students enroll at Poly Prep's Middle and Upper School campus located at 9216 Seventh Avenue in Brooklyn, where they continue their education through 8th grade and then into high school.

Athletics

Interscholastic Leagues
Poly Prep is part of the Ivy Preparatory School League, a division of the greater New York State Association of Independent Schools (NYSAIS), which comprises all the private schools in the state. The school has a number of award-winning programs, most notably football, basketball, and baseball. Hockey was introduced in 2010.

Athletic teams

Headmasters of the Country Day School
In the  years since the opening of the Dyker Heights campus in 1917, Poly has had five headmasters: Joseph Dana Allen (1917–1949), J. Folwell Scull (1949–1970), William M. Williams (1970–2000), David Harman (2000–2016), and Audrius Barzdukas (2016–present).

Notable alumni and attendees

Louis Aronne, obesity medicine specialist at Weill Cornell Medicine
Robert Briskman (born 1932), co-founder of SIRIUS Satellite Radio 
Michael Brown (1949–2015), founder/member of bands The Left Banke and Stories, composer of "Walk Away Renée" and "Pretty Ballerina." Known as Michael Lookofsky during Poly years. (Did not graduate with class of 1967)
Rob Brown, actor 
Bruce Cutler (born 1948), criminal defense attorney 
Ken Dashow (born 1958), radio personality
Calvert DeForest (1921-2007), actor, comedian best known for work on the David Letterman Show as Larry "Bud" Melman
Kenneth Duberstein (born 1944), White House Chief of Staff to President Ronald Reagan; political consultant 
Brian Flores, head coach of the NFL's Miami Dolphins
Dan Fogler (born 1976), actor; Tony Award for 25th Annual Putnam County Spelling Bee 
Joel Gertner (born 1975), professional wrestling personality
Jahkeen Gilmore (born 1983), former NFL wide receiver for the Carolina Panthers
Louisa Gummer (born 1991), model 
Briton Hadden (1898-1929), co-founder of Time magazine
Harold Hellenbrand, university professor, administrator, and author 
P. J. Hill (born 1987), former NFL running back 
R. M. Koster (born 1934), novelist
Rich Kotite (born 1942), former NFL player and coach
Arthur Levitt (born 1931), Chairman of the United States Securities and Exchange Commission, 1993-2001; Chairman of the American Stock Exchange, 1978-1989 
Howard Levy (born 1951), musician and Grammy Award winner (with Bela Fleck and The Flecktones) 
Seth Low (1851–1916), Mayor of Brooklyn and New York City; President of Columbia University
Charles E. Marsters (1883-1962), lacrosse player
William C. McCreery (1896–1988), American lawyer and member of the New York State Assembly 
Joseph McElroy (born 1930) novelist 
Joakim Noah (born 1985), professional basketball player who played in the NBA for the Chicago Bulls and New York Knicks
Eric Olsen (born 1988), professional football player who played in the NFL for the New Orleans Saints 
Park Cannon (born 1991), member of the Georgia House of Representatives from the 58th District 
Richard Perry (born 1942), record producer 
Stewart Rahr, founder and owner of Kinray, the largest privately held pharmaceutical distributor in the world 
Max Rose (born 1986), US Congressman from New York's 11th congressional district, and US Army Bronze Star recipient.
Alfred P. Sloan (1875–1966), General Motors Corporation President, 1923-1937; CEO, 1923-1946; Chairman, 1937-1956 
Bonnie Somerville (born 1974) actress
 Stephen E. Smith (1927–1990), brother-in-law and campaign manager for President John F. Kennedy.
 Joe Tacopina (born 1966), criminal defense lawyer and owner//president/chairman of Italian soccer club Venezia F.C.
Bob Telson (born 1949), composer (The Gospel at Colonus)
Henry van Dyke Jr. (1852-1933), author, educator and clergyman
Isaiah Wilson (born 1999), NFL offensive lineman, Miami Dolphins
Angela Yee (born 1976), radio host on Sirius XM's Shade 45
Armin Tehrany, New York City based orthopaedic surgeon and film producer

References

External links
 

Dyker Heights, Brooklyn
Private elementary schools in Brooklyn
Private middle schools in Brooklyn
Private high schools in Brooklyn
Private K-12 schools in New York City
Preparatory schools in New York City
School sexual abuse scandals
Ivy Preparatory School League
Educational institutions established in 1854
1854 establishments in New York (state)